WO410-0913 is a hyper-luminous galaxy and an early universe star forming galaxy that is around 12 billion light years (ly) from earth. WO410-0913 has a swarm of 24 galaxies close to the WO410-0913 galaxy that may activate a quasar. Due to this, it is one of the most massive, brightest and gas rich galaxy in the early universe.

References 

Galaxies